The AnimaniA Award is an award for Japanese popular culture that has been presented by the German magazine AnimaniA since 2006.The award ceremony takes place during the opening ceremony of AnimagiC.

Overview 
The AnimaniA Award is an audience award , which means that the winners of each category are determined by the audience or the readers of AnimaniA magazine in a Secret ballot. Each participant in the online voting can rate the nominees up to five points or leave no answer. The titles and artists receiving the most points at the end of the voting period will be recognized at the awards ceremony. Around 12,000 votes were cast for the AnimaniA Awards in 2018 and in 2019  and 2020 around 15,000. Participants in the online voting have the opportunity to win non-cash prizes provided by the sponsors of the award ceremony.  In the past, votes could also be cast by post . Each reader was only allowed to vote once. Readers who submitted multiple ballots were disqualified.

Titles that were first published in Germany in the previous calendar year are up for voting. For this purpose, the participating publishers present titles from their program in the individual categories. However, the nominees in the categories of Best Director, Best Character Design, Best Studio and Best Online Series will be named by the AnimaniA editorial team.  Nominations are announced annually in the second print edition of the magazine each year; the winners on the website and in the sixth issue of the magazine each year.

Prizes will be awarded in thirteen categories (as of 2021) :

 Best Anime (Series, OVA , Movie)
 Best Online Series
 Best animation studio
 Best Director
 Best Character Design
 Best Manga (National, International)
 Best J-Music (Ani-Score, Ani-Song)
 Best J Game
 Best J-Movie/Series ( Live Action )

Winners and nominations

1st AnimaniA Award (2006)

2nd AnimaniA Award (2007)

3. AnimaniA Award (2008)

4th AnimaniA Award (2009)

5th AnimaniA Award (2010)

6th AnimaniA Award (2011)

7th AnimaniA Award (2012)

8th AnimaniA Award (2013)

9th AnimaniA Award (2014)

10th AnimaniA Award (2015)

11th AnimaniA Award (2016)

12th AnimaniA Award (2017)

13th AnimaniA Award (2018)

14th AnimaniA Award (2019)

15th AnimaniA Award (2020)

References

External links 
 

Animation awards
German film awards